Shamil Abbyasov (born 16 April 1957) is a retired athlete, who represented the USSR and later Kyrgyzstan. He specialized in the long jump and triple jump.

Abbyasov won a bronze and a gold medal at the 1981 European Indoor Championships in Grenoble. His gold medal was in triple jump with an indoor world record of 17.30, that lasted for three weeks.

Abbyasov is married to Tatyana Kolpakova and has three children. He has a degree in mechanical engineering and has worked in the field after retiring from sports.

External links

1957 births
Living people
Soviet male long jumpers
Soviet male triple jumpers
Kyrgyzstani long jumpers
Kyrgyzstani male triple jumpers